Silvia Obrist is a Swiss wheelchair curler.

Teams

References

External links 

Living people
Swiss female curlers
Swiss wheelchair curlers
World wheelchair curling champions
Year of birth missing (living people)